A Change of Destiny (Traditional Chinese: 天機算) is a TVB costume drama series broadcast in April 2007.

The series is about two young men having the same birthday but have both of them have a different life. Benny Chan is from a rich family while Steven Ma is poor and they both hope to change their destiny with tui bei tu.

Synopsis
Yip Yeung (Benny Chan) is interested in knowing the future with the use of diagrams,"tui bei tu", passed on from the past. These diagrams have the ability to predict future events so that readers can find luck or escape tragedy. Yuen Hei (Steven Ma) tricks Yip Yeung into buying fake diagrams he had created, but is later confronted by Lee Sing-Tin (Yuen Wah).

Lee Sing-Tin sees potential in Yip Yeung and Yuen Hei. He takes them in as his apprentice to teach them about his knowledge on these diagrams. Yip Yeung later discovers that he is a royal blood from the descendant of the last royal throne. He attempts to use his prediction skills to take over the King's throne but only foresees tragedy in every way he is planning to change destiny...

Cast
 Note: Some of the characters' names are in Cantonese romanisation.

Viewership ratings

Awards and nominations
40th TVB Anniversary Awards (2007)
 "Best Drama"
 "Best Actress in a Supporting Role" (Mimi Lo - Chiu Fei)

References

External links
 TVB.com A Change of Destiny - Official Website 
 K for TVB.net A Change of Destiny - Episodic Synopsis and Screen Captures

TVB dramas
Television series set in the Five Dynasties and Ten Kingdoms period
Television series set in the Northern Song
2007 Hong Kong television series debuts
2007 Hong Kong television series endings